Adú is a 2020 Spanish drama film directed by Salvador Calvo, written by Alejandro Hernández and starring Moustapha Oumarou, Luis Tosar and Álvaro Cervantes. The film premiered in Spain on 31 January 2020.

The film won four Goya Awards, including Best Director for Calvo and Best New Actor for Adam Nourou, from a total of thirteen nominations, at the 35th Goya Awards.

Plot 
The film intertwines three storylines related to the African immigration to Europe. A six-year-old boy and his older sister make a desperate attempt to flee Cameroon for Europe, waiting on a runway to smuggle themselves inside an airplane's cargo hold. Not far away, an activist against illegal hunting discovers the terrible scene of a dead elephant, its tusks removed. As well as fighting against illegal poaching, he has to face issues with his daughter, recently arrived in the country. Thousands of miles to the north, in Melilla, a group of civil guards face a mass assault on the Melilla border fence by Africans desperate to gain access to Spain.

Cast

Production 
The film is a Telecinco Cinema, Ikiru Films, La Terraza Films, Un Mundo Prohibido AIE and Mogambo production, it had the collaboration of Mediaset España and Mediterráneo Mediaset España Group and funding from ICAA.

Awards and nominations

References

External links
 
 

2020 films
2020 drama films
2020s Spanish-language films
Spanish drama films
Spanish multilingual films
Films directed by Salvador Calvo
Films produced by Álvaro Augustin
Films produced by Ghislain Barrois
Films produced by Edmon Roch
Films produced by Javier Ugarte
Films with screenplays by Alejandro Hernández
Films set in Cameroon
Films set in Mauritania
Films set in Morocco
Films set in Senegal
Films set in Spain
Films shot in Benin
Films shot in Morocco
Films shot in Spain
Paramount Pictures films
Telecinco Cinema films
Ikiru Films films
2020s Spanish films